Facing You is the first solo piano album recorded by pianist Keith Jarrett, the first of his voluminous collection to be produced by Manfred Eicher and his first work to be released by ECM Records. It features eight solo piano pieces (improvised and/or composed by himself) and it was recorded in the studio. It marked the beginning of Jarrett's innovative and successful career in spontaneous and improvised performance on solo piano, and it constitutes a landmark in his fruitful association with ECM Records.

The album was recorded in Oslo (Norway) on November 10, 1971, one day after a concert performance with the Miles Davis Septet in the same city. It was released in 1972 and has been reissued many times in different formats, including vinyl.

Critical reception
In a 1972 review for Rolling Stone, Bob Palmer called the album "perhaps the best solo piano recording since Art Tatum left us."

The album won the Grand Prix des Festivals at Montreux in 1973.

The Allmusic review by Michael G. Nastos awarded the album 4½ stars, stating, "A remarkable effort that reveals more and more with each listen, this recording has stood the test of time, and is unquestionably a Top Three recording in Keith Jarrett's long and storied career.". The review also states that:

In October 2007 writing for jazz.com, Ted Gioia gave the track In Front a 100/100 rating and praised it:

Regarding In Front and writing for JazzTimes, in 2011 pianist Kenny Werner stated that:

Moreover, when it comes to the whole album, he adds:

Aftermath and legacy
In 2000, in an interview with Terry Gross, Keith Jarrett explained how the idea of long solo piano concerts began:

In a DownBeat interview with Bob Palmer, Jarrett expressed his gratitude to Eicher for the opportunity to record for ECM: "If I hadn't found him there would be no solo albums, no Facing You, let alone a successful triple album. I would have a desk full of scores that have never been rehearsed, not to mention played or recorded. There's no way I can repay that possibility having come to me so early and at such a good time except to produce more music for ECM. They took the risk and the expense, or Manfred did."

Track listing
All compositions by Keith Jarrett
 "In Front" – 10:09
 "Ritooria" – 5:57
 "Lalene" – 8:39
 "My Lady, My Child" –  7:24
 "Landscape for Future Earth" – 3:36
 "Starbright" – 5:07
 "Vapallia" – 3:57
 "Semblence" – 3:02

Personnel 
 Keith Jarrett – piano

Production
 Manfred Eicher - producer
 Jan Erik Kongshaug - recording engineer
 Danny Michael - photography
 Barbara and Burkhart Wojirsch - cover design and layout

References 

Keith Jarrett albums
ECM Records albums
1972 albums
Albums produced by Manfred Eicher
Instrumental albums
Solo piano jazz albums